Ronald Alan Waldron (born 9 January 1927) is an English medievalist, considered a pre-eminent expert in the field of early English literature. He wrote many books and was a lecturer at the University of Aarhus in Denmark and King's College London.  He made an especial focus on the poem Sir Gawain and the Green Knight.

Early life

Waldron was born and raised in Teignmouth in south Devon, attending Teignmouth Grammar School. After leaving school he worked as a clerk at Teignmouth Electric Company before being called up for national service late in World War II. After the war under the governmental Further Education and Training Scheme programme he attended the University College of the South West of England and graduated in 1951, then did postgraduate work at Royal Holloway College of the University of London, graduating in 1953. He was married to Mary (née Mary Margaret Dodd) in 1955 and they had three children. His first book, published by the Oxford University Press in 1967, was Sense and Sense Development, a non-technical work on semantics.

Books about Ronald Alan Waldron 

 New Perspectives on Middle English Texts: a Festschrift for R. A. Waldron

Works written or edited by Ronald Alan Waldron 
 Sir Gawain and the Green Knight

 The Poems of the Pearl Manuscript: Pearl, Cleanness, Patience, Sir Gawain and the Green Knight

 Medieval English Studies Presented to George Kane

 The Complete Works of the Pearl Poet

 Doublets in the Translation Techniques of John Trevisa

References 

1927 births
People from Teignmouth
British medievalists
Academics of King's College London
British military personnel of World War II
Alumni of the University of Exeter
Alumni of Royal Holloway, University of London
Academic staff of Aarhus University
Possibly living people